Jules Richard may refer to:
 Jules Richard (mathematician)
 Jules Richard (oceanographer)
 Jules Richard (photographer)